Hard 'n' Heavy is the debut studio album by Canadian heavy metal band Anvil.  It was originally released independently under the band name "Lips".

Critical reception
Reviewer Toots Daley from British magazine Kerrang! in beginning of 1982 expressed a joy from pleasant surprise made by this album. As per him the "main strength" of Anvil "lies in the guitar/vocal prowess of Lips who comes on like a young Steve Tyler crossed with a butch Rob Halford".

Track listing

Personnel
Anvil
Steve "Lips" Kudlow – vocals, guitar
Dave Allison – guitar, lead vocals on "I Want You Both (With Me)" and "Oh Jane"
Ian Dickson – bass
Robb Reiner – drums

Additional musicians
Bess Ross – background vocals

Production
Paul LaChapelle – engineer, mixing
Dean Motter – art direction and design

References

1981 debut albums
Anvil (band) albums
Attic Records albums